Hablamos Español was a 1971 German educational television series produced by NDR, teaching Spanish as a foreign or second language to German viewers. This series was divided into three parts of 13 episodes each.

See also
List of German television series

1971 German television series debuts
1971 German television series endings
German educational television series
Spanish-language education television programming
Das Erste original programming